Brentwood is a station on the Main Line (Ronkonkoma Branch) of the Long Island Rail Road. It is officially located at Suffolk County Road 100 (Suffolk Avenue) and Brentwood Road in Brentwood, New York. However, it has parking facilities and other amenities that are extended far beyond its given location. The actual station is located across the tracks from the dead end of Eighth Street near Leroy Avenue.

History
The first station was originally known as Modern Times station and was renamed Brentwood on September 7, 1864. The post office moved here from Thompson's station on January 17, 1870. Inhabitants donated land and money for the depot which was erected in 1870. The depot was burned in April 1903 and was replaced on November 10, 1903. Until 1987, Brentwood station was located on First Avenue between Fourth Street and Brentwood Road. It was moved as part of a major electrification and reconstruction project of the line in Ronkonkoma, Central Islip, Brentwood, Deer Park, and Wyandanch. Originally, the LIRR had planned to merge Deer Park, Pineaire, and Brentwood stations into a single station, but residential opposition blocked that proposal, and only Deer Park and Pineaire were merged. The current station was built close to the former Brentwood station, which was converted into a restaurant shortly after it was abandoned. All grade crossings in the Brentwood area remained unchanged after the station was moved.

Thompson's station

Prior to the construction of Brentwood station, another station existed in Brentwood where the Sagtikos State Parkway now crosses over the Main Line of the Long Island Rail Road. This was known as Thompson's station or Thompson's Siding, and served as a private home, a station, an Inn, and a general store. It was opened as a station on June 24, 1842, with the arrival of the railroad, and closed in December 1869, before Brentwood station was built further east. The railroad spur continued to exist through the 20th Century and was used as a freight spur which served industries such as Hills Supermarkets, Thompson Tires and Carnation Paper. The site was replaced with the former Pineaire in 1915, until it was closed in 1986 and combined into the new Deer Park west of Sagtikos State Parkway.

Station layout
This station has two high-level side platforms, each 12 cars long.

Gallery

References

External links 
 

Unofficial LIRR History Website
March 2000 Photographs - Current and Former Brentwood Stations
Brentwood History Collection
Station 1905 and Station 1908 and Station 1910
Ron Ziel Collection
Station 1937
Unofficial LIRR Photography Site (lirrpics.com)
Brentwood Station
Brentwood Station and "SG" Cabin History (TrainsAreFun.com)
BRENT Interlocking (The LIRR Today)
Station from Brentwood Road from Google Maps Street View

Long Island Rail Road stations in Suffolk County, New York
Islip (town), New York
Railway stations in the United States opened in 1987